Oliver Lansley (born 1981) is a British actor and writer. He is best known for writing the screenplay for the 2010 sitcom Whites.

Filmography

Film

Television

Video games

Staff credits

References

External links
 

1981 births
Living people
British male television actors
British male film actors
British television writers
British male television writers
21st-century British male actors